The 1909 Taunton by-election was held on 23 February 1909.  The by-election was held due to the ill health of the incumbent Conservative MP, Edward Boyle.  It was won by the Conservative candidate William Peel, previously the MP for Manchester South. Peel was the son of Arthur Peel, 1st Viscount Peel, a former Liberal MP and  Speaker of the House of Commons, and the grandson of former Prime Minister Robert Peel.

References

Taunton by-election
History of Taunton
Taunton by-election
By-elections to the Parliament of the United Kingdom in Somerset constituencies
20th century in Somerset
Taunton by-election